Sedid (also Romanized as Sedīd and Sadīd; also known as Sadit) is a village in Qasabeh-ye Sharqi Rural District, in the Central District of Sabzevar County, Razavi Khorasan Province, Iran. At the 2006 census, its population was 113, in 27 families.

References 

Populated places in Sabzevar County